San Marino competed in the Winter Olympic Games for the first time at the 1976 Winter Olympics in Innsbruck, Austria.

Alpine skiing

Men

References
Official Olympic Reports
 Olympic Winter Games 1976, full results by sports-reference.com

Nations at the 1976 Winter Olympics
1976 Winter Olympics
Winter Olympics